Downtown Erie, is the central business, cultural and government center for the city of Erie, Pennsylvania. 
Erie’s Central Business District includes Gannon University, UPMC Hamot hospital, Erie Insurance, and city and county government offices, as well as other non-government related commercial retail and office development.  Nearly 20,000 people work in downtown Erie. As of 2000, 2,690 people lived downtown.

Location
Downtown Erie is a 70 block area. From the foot of State Street to 14th Street (North and South), and from Holland Street to Sassafras Street (East and West).

Transportation
Trolley- Downtown is served by the EMTA's Bay Liner trolley system, a free trolley service that travels from the foot of State Street to 14th Street. 
Taxi- The Erie Cab Co. runs seven days a week. Erie taxis are permitted to pick up passengers in response to a street hail.
Bus- The EMTA's buses runs seven days a week in the city.

Downtown Districts
Downtown Erie is divided into three different areas, Bayfront district, downtown center city and midtown.

Bayfront
Bayfront district is home to much of downtown’s employers. It is home to Gannon University, UPMC Hamot hospital, and Erie Insurance. The Bayfront district is also where the Bayfront Convention Center and Sheraton Hotel are located. The Blasco Library, Erie Maritime Museum, Erie Art Museum, restaurants, bars and marinas are all located in the Bayfront district.

Center City

Center City is where many of the Erie’s high rise buildings are located. The Renaissance Centre is Erie’s tallest building. Located in the center city are: The Boston Store, The Warner Theatre, Erie Insurance Arena, UPMC Park, Perry Square, restaurants, bars and night clubs as well as many retail shops. Center city is also home to 14 banks. Also located in the center city is Gannon University, as well St. Peter's Cathedral. The cathedral is the city's largest structure, standing 265 feet (81 m) tall.

Midtown
Midtown, located from 18th Street/Former Norfolk Southern tracks to 26th Street.

Downtown redevelopment 
The Erie Redevelopment Authority made a master plan to redevelop the entire downtown area. As of fall 2009 the first phase was nearly complete.  The first phase was the redevelopment of midtown. Other redevelopments of the downtown include: a $42 million renovation to the Erie Insurance Arena, streetscape improvements to 12th street, facade improvements to many downtown buildings, new building and retail development and new townhouses and residential condos along the bayfront bluffs.

References

Economy of Erie, Pennsylvania
Erie